Lamprobityle is a genus of beetles in the family Cerambycidae, containing the following species:

 Lamprobityle azurea (Vives, 2012)
 Lamprobityle conspersa (Aurivillius, 1927)
 Lamprobityle fasciata (Vives, 2012)
 Lamprobityle magnifica Heller, 1923
 Lamprobityle mariae (Vives, 2009)
 Lamprobityle mindanaoensis Barševskis & Jäger, 2014
 Lamprobityle rugulata (Vives, 2012)

References

Apomecynini